Pierson–Griffiths House, also known as the Kemper House, is a historic home located at Indianapolis, Indiana.  It was built in 1873, and is a -story, rectangular, five bay frame dwelling on a low brick foundation. It has elements of Greek Revival and Second Empire style architecture.  It features a full-width front porch with grouped columns and a low hipped roof with decorative cut wood cresting around the perimeter.

It was listed on the National Register of Historic Places in 1978.

References

Houses on the National Register of Historic Places in Indiana
Greek Revival houses in Indiana
Second Empire architecture in Indiana
Houses completed in 1873
Houses in Indianapolis
National Register of Historic Places in Indianapolis